Mr. Brooks...A Better Tomorrow is the second studio album by Jamaican dancehall artist Mavado, released on 3 March 2009. The album was recorded between 2008 and 2009 and features tracks such as "So Special", "Overcome", "So Blessed", "On The Rock", and "Money Changer". The album had no featured artists, unlike his previous album, Gangsta for Life: The Symphony of David Brooks, which was released in 2007.

Track listing

References

2009 albums
VP Records albums